George William Wallace Webber (1875–1967) was a notable New Zealand postmaster, boarding-house keeper and farmer. He was born in Nelson, New Zealand in 1875.

References

1875 births
1967 deaths
New Zealand hoteliers
People from Nelson, New Zealand